The Gary Area Career Center is a career and technical education (CTE) school governed by the Gary Community School Corporation in Gary, Indiana, United States.

Students 
Attending the Career Center are eleventh and twelfth grade students from Gary high schools and Gary charter high schools.  High school students from all public high schools in Northwest Indiana are welcome to attend.

Staff 
The faculty includes 13 teachers. The courses offered are: Cosmetology, Barbering, Welding, Auto Mechanics, Auto Body, Early Childhood Education, Graphic Imaging, Culinary Arts and Radio/TV Production.  New programming for the 2018–2019 school year will include Aviation Flight, Aviation Mechanics, Aviation Operations, EMT/EMS and Dental Assisting.

Media 
88.7 FM WGVE, an educational radio station, is broadcast from the career center and is used as an educational resource.

External links 
Gary Area Career Center Official Site

Schools in Gary, Indiana
Educational institutions established in 1988
Public high schools in Indiana
1988 establishments in Indiana